Gangi may refer to:

 Gangi River, A river in India.
 Gangi, India, a town in India
Gangi, Sicily, a town in Italy
Palazzo Valguarnera-Gangi, a townhouse in Palermo, Sicily
Rosario Gangi, a New York City mobster and captain in the Genovese crime family
 Snowroof, the translation of 雁木 gangi an opening and castle in shogi